WVTC is the radio station of Vermont Technical College, operating on a 90.7 MHz FM carrier (channel 214) with an effective radiated power (ERP) of 300 watts. The station is located in Morey Hall on the Randolph Center campus. WVTC is operated and maintained by the students of VTC through the Radio Club, and is financially supported by VTC Student Council.

History
WVTC began in 1963 as a small AM station on 640 kHz with a 2-watt transmitter in the Old Dorm building. It is unclear how the antenna system worked; there is speculation that it may have been a carrier current system. The 1965 VTC yearbook distinguished between the Radio Club and the Radio Station WVTC-AM 640. In 1966 a new dorm building, Morey Hall, was built on the Randolph Center campus, including provisions for a campus radio station. In September 1968, the college applied for and began construction of a new licensed educational FM station.  On June 23, 1969 the radio station received a license from the FCC to broadcast as WVTC-FM at 90.7 MHz and 10 watts.

The station prospered during the 1970s, with the involvement of Howard Ginsberg, who later founded WXXX, a successful commercial Top 40 station in Burlington, Vermont. In April 1980, the station was granted an increase in power from 10 watts to 300 watts effective radiated power.

In the 1990s, WVTC migrated to CD technology in addition to the existing records and tapes. From April to November 1995 the station was off the air due to a failed Emergency Broadcast System (EBS) receiver and other potential violations. Many upgrades were performed the in 1996, including new studio and broadcasting equipment. Remote broadcasts were done from around campus and from basketball games.  MP3s were introduced as an on-air medium the same year. The first mp3 played on the station was "Stupid Girl" by Garbage.  A new FM transmitter, feedline were installed and a new 30' tower with antenna was erected on December 26, 1996.

Station staff created an improved FM radio card driver (AZTEC) for Linux and their code was added to the Linux Kernel.  The station began internet webcasting in February 1997, streaming both music and webcam images, the first on-line radio streaming station in Northern New England, sending a copy of on-air audio over MP3 format at 16kbit/s using custom written linux software on a Pentium 60 computer.

In 1997, the station experimented with station automation, using multi-CD changers, controlled via serial connection...becoming MP3 based before the system was complete.  In 1998 the "WebDJ" automation system went live, allowing users to place requests online. Secondary Carrier Authorization (SCA) technology was explored, with data being sent over the air about weather and news events at 1200 baud. WVTC began broadcast operation 24/7 for the first time, and ranked in the broadcast ratings for Central Vermont.  Over 80 hours of shows were performed by over 70 members of the WVTC club each week and listeners of the online stream were logged on all 7 continents. Technological innovations of 1998 included an upgrade to a 32kbit/s stream using a computer club purchased Linux server with two processors called "Halftime", as well as the creation of a remote control interface for the Winamp application.

In March 2000, DJ "Disco" Vince Giffin set a world record for the longest time for a single DJ on the air, at 73 hours. In 2001 MP3 music replaced CDs as the station's primary audio storage format. In 2006 the station's survival was jeopardised by low membership, and went off the air due to transmitter problems during the summer, returning after repairs in the fall. The following Spring a small group of students banded together to prevent the school administration from shutting down WVTC. Some hardware and software upgrades were performed in the spring and a couple of regular shows were broadcast.

In October 2007, the station was forced to shut down when their FCC license failed to be renewed by the college. Shortly afterwards, the college was approached by Vermont Public Radio with proposals to lease the station, which was not accepted. The station resumed transmission in October 2008, but went offline again before the end of the year after repeated power failures damaged their equipment. The equipment was eventually repaired, and transmission resumed in Fall 2009.

In the spring of 2011 the station filed a Consent Decree with the FCC, and returned to being a fully licensed station after a Final Consent Decree Inspection in Fall 2013. In Fall 2015 the internet stream was upgraded to 320kpbs.

Trivia
The station, operating at 90.7 MHz and 300 watts emits 4.991789x1027 photons per second.

Gallery

References

External links
WVTC website
 

VTC
Radio stations established in 1961
1961 establishments in Vermont
VTC